The Mayor of Hyderabad heads the Hyderabad Municipal Corporation (HMC), the local body which controls the Local Government system of Hyderabad. The longest-serving mayor of Hyderabad is Jamil Ahmed, who was elected twice to the office of mayor and served from 1962 to 1971.

Local government system of Hyderabad 

Hyderabad Local Government system is the Third Tier of the system of political governance in Pakistan after the Federal Government and the Provincial Government. Hyderabad Local government is managed by Hyderabad Municipal Corporation (HMC) according to Sindh Local Government act 2013. HMC looks after local government system of the towns of Hyderabad city and Latifabad.

Jinnah Hall

Jinnah Hall has historical significance and it is the meeting place for Hyderabad city council sessions.

List of mayors of Hyderabad

Hyderabad local government history

City District Government Hyderabad (2000 - 2010) 

According to Sindh Local Government Ordinance (SLGO) 2001, three new districts (formerly its talukas) were made in 2005. Latifabad, Qasimabad and Hyderabad city.

City of Hyderabad underwent major development during the tenure of Kunwar Naveed Jamil. Many flyovers such as Latifabad flyover, Hosh Muhammad Shedi flyover, Ghulam Shah Kalhoro flyover, Sakhi Abdul Wahab flyover, renovation of Hyderabad Eid Gah, renovation of Rani Bagh, renovation of Hasrat Mohani Library, construction of Hyderabad Civic Centre, several parks for public recreation etc.

In 2010 after mayor of Hyderabad completed his term, the City District Government Hyderabad was dissolved and the administrator system was implemented in 2010 - 2016

Hyderabad Municipal Corporation (2013 - present) 
Hyderabad City District Government was abolished by PPP in 2010 and imposed commissioner system. Sindh Local Government Act (SLGA) 2013 was passed in order to counter SLGO 2001 which was passed by Pervez Musharraf. The ruling Pakistan Peoples Party has separated Qasimabad district from the HMC to create the 27-ward municipal committee. However the formation of the Qasimabad municipal committee has already been challenged before the Sindh High Court.

on the orders of Supreme court, Sindh Government finally conducted Hyderabad Local Government election after a gap of 6 years as a second phase of Local Government elections in Sindh. comprised District of Latifabad and Hyderabad City.

Hyderabad was distributed into 96 Union committees.

Mayor election 2016 

On August 24, 2016, through Mayor elections, Tayyab Hussain and Suhail Mashadi of MQM were elected Mayor and Deputy Mayor of Hyderabad respectively. They bagged 111 votes, while their rival PPP candidates got 27 votes. They took oath on August 30, 2016.

Many of the MQM chairmen and vice chairmen were elected unopposed even before the elections.

See also 
 Kunwar Naveed Jamil
 Hyderabad
 Mayor of Karachi
 Latifabad

References 

Mayors of Hyderabad, Sindh
Hyderabad
Hyderabad, Sindh-related lists